Kamanio Chattopadhyay (born 1950) is an Indian materials engineer and an honorary professor at the Indian Institute of Science, Bengaluru.
 He is the chair of the Mechanical Sciences Division of IISc and a former chair of the Department of Materials Engineering.

Chattopadhyay is best known for his discovery of decagonal nanoquantum quasicrystals which he accomplished in 1985, along with L. Bendersky and S. Ranganathan. He is also credited with researches on synthesis and characterization of quasicrystals and nanocomposites and is an elected fellow of all the three major Indian science academies viz. Indian Academy of Sciences, Indian National Science Academy and National Academy of Sciences, India as well as the Indian National Academy of Engineering. The Council of Scientific and Industrial Research, the apex agency of the Government of India for scientific research, awarded him the Shanti Swarup Bhatnagar Prize for Science and Technology, one of the highest Indian science awards for his contributions to Engineering Sciences in 1995.

Biography 

Born on 3 March 1950 in the Indian state of West Bengal, K. Chattopadhyay completed his graduate studies in mechanical engineering from the Regional Engineering College, Durgapur (present-day National Institute of Technology, Durgapur) of Burdwan University in 1974 and moved to Indian Institute of Technology (BHU) Varanasi where he did his master's degree in 1973. Subsequently, he enrolled for his doctoral studies there under the guidance of Patcha Ramachandra Rao, a Shanti Swarup Bhatnagar laureate, and during the course of his research, he joined BHU as a lecturer in 1975. After securing a PhD in 1978, he relocated to the US for his post-doctoral studies which he completed at the laboratory of Hubert Aaronson of Carnegie Mellon University. Returning to India in 1983, he joined the Indian Institute of Science as an assistant professor where he served out his regular service till his superannuation in 2015. During this period, he served as the chair of the Materials Research Centre from 2000 to 2004, as the chair of the Department of Materials Engineering from 2004 to 2008, as the convenor of the Institute Nano Science Initiative from 2007 to 2010 and as the chair of the Division of Mechanical Sciences during 2008-2015. Post-retirement, he continues his association with IISc in various capacities; he is associated with the research activities of the Centre for Nano Science and Engineering (CeNSE), heads the Advanced Facility for Electron Microscopy as its convenor since 2010, serves as the convenor of Interdisciplinary Centre for Energy Research since 2012, and is the head of the Non Equilibrium Processing and Nano Materials Group. In between, he had several stints abroad and the visiting research professorship at Carnegie Mellon University, visiting professorships at the Cooperative Research and Development Center for Advanced Materials of Tohoku University and Kyoto University and visiting scientist assignments at Oxford University, Cambridge University and Illinois University are some of them.

Chattopadhyay is married to Sukanya and the couple lives in Bengaluru.

Legacy 

The early researches of Chattopadhyay during his doctoral studies with Ramachandra Rao were on rapid solidification of aluminum alloys and it was during this time he is reported to have discovered aluminum-based binary glass and nanodispersed composites. Later, at Carnegie Mellon University, he worked along with Hubert Aaronson, on growth of bainite in Cu-Zn system and the related controversy and he continued his work after his return to India, collaborating with L. Bendersky and S. Ranganathan which led to the discovery of decagonal quasicrystals in 1985. His work, both experimental and theoretical, assisted in the synthesis and characterization of several quasicrystals and nanocomposites. He is also credited with wider studies in synthesis of nanocomposites, phase transformations, large superheating phenomenon during melting, dissimilar joining processes, surface modifications and nanostructured magnetic alloys. Later, he shifted his focus to the development of high temperature aluminum alloys and steel which has applications in aerospace and energy industries as well as ultrahigh strength multi-component alloys like bulk metallic glasses that are ductile. His researches have been documented in several peer-reviewed articles; Google Scholar and ResearchGate, online repositories of scientific articles, have listed 407 and 360 of them respectively. Besides, he has authored one book, Aluminum Based Nanoeutectics: Synthesis and Microstructure and has contributed chapters to books edited by others. He also holds a number of patents which include those on Solder compositions, Nickel-Aluminium-Zirconium alloys and High Impact Solder Toughness Alloy.

Chattopadhyay is the co-director of Solar Energy Research Institute for India and United States (SERIIUS), an Indo-US joint venture for the development of low cost solar electric technologies, and has conducted a number of seminars and symposia on behalf of the consortium. He is involved in many inter-institutional exchange programs which include the research associations of Indian Institute of Science with Cambridge University and Exeter University. He is the coordinator of the National Microgravity Research Programme (NMRP), a multidisciplinary research forum of the Indian Space Research Organization for advanced research in Microgravity science. He is a member of the National Steering Committee of the Indian Institute of Metals and served as its vice president during 2012-13 and as the president for the term 2013-14. He co-chaired the 11th Asian Microgravity Symposium–2016 held at Hokkaido University, Japan and sat in the advisory committees of the International Conference on Metals and Materials Research organized by the Indian Indian Institute of Science, held in June 2016 and the International Symposium on Energy Materials : Opportunities and Challenges (ISEM-2011) held at Central Glass and Ceramic Research Institute, Kolkata in March 2011. Besides mentoring a number of master's and doctoral scholars in their studies, he has delivered invited or keynote addresses at several conferences which include Fifth International Conference on Solidification Science and Processing, International Workshop on Advanced Co-based Superalloys: 3.0 and International Conference on Functional Nanomaterials and he is a speaker designate at the TMS Annual Meeting and Exhibition to be held in March 2017 at San Diego, California. He is a former editor of the Journal of Materials Science of Springer Science+Business Media and is a member of the Board of Trustees of T. R. Anantharaman Education and Research Foundation, a Hyderabad-based non-profit organization promoting human resource development in engineering sciences.

Books

Chapters

Scientific articles

General articles

Patents

Awards and honors 
Chattopadhyay received the first major award of his career in 1979 when he was chosen for the Young Scientists Medal by the Indian National Science Academy. He received the MRSI Medal of the Materials Research Society of India in 1990 and the Council of Scientific and Industrial Research awarded him the Shanti Swarup Bhatnagar Prize, one of the highest Indian science awards in 1995. He received the Platinum Jubilee Award of Banaras Hindu University in 1998 and the Alumni Award for Excellence in Research in Science/Engineering of the Indian Institute of Science in 2002. A year later, the Indian Institute of Metals chose him for the 2003 G. D. Birla Gold medal. The Government of India awarded him the National Metallurgists' Day Award in R&D and Academia category in 2009 and he received the Lifetime Achievement Award of the Electron Microscope Society of India in 2011.

The Indian Academy of Sciences elected Chattopadhyay as a fellow in 1995 and he became a fellow of the Indian National Science Academy in 1996 with the National Academy of Sciences, India following suit in 1999. The Electron Microscope Society of India chose him as a fellow in 2009 and the Indian Institute of Metals made him an honorary life member in 2014. He is also an elected fellow of the Indian National Academy of Engineering. Non-Equilibrium Processing and Nanomaterials Laboratory of the Indian Institute of Science felicitated him in 2015, on his retirement from service, with a seminar and the screening of a Metallurgist’s Diary, a 20-minute long documentary on the life and work of Chattopadhyay made by his students at IISc.

See also 

 Amorphous metal
 Nanomaterials
 Arindam Ghosh
 Dan Shechtman

Notes

References

External links

Further reading 
 
 

Recipients of the Shanti Swarup Bhatnagar Award in Engineering Science
1950 births
Indian scientific authors
Fellows of the Indian Academy of Sciences
Indian metallurgists
Engineers from West Bengal
University of Burdwan alumni
Banaras Hindu University alumni
Academic staff of Banaras Hindu University
Carnegie Mellon University faculty
Academic staff of the Indian Institute of Science
University of Illinois faculty
Academic staff of Tohoku University
Academic staff of Kyoto University
Fellows of the Indian National Science Academy
Fellows of The National Academy of Sciences, India
Living people
Indian materials scientists
Fellows of the Indian National Academy of Engineering
20th-century Indian engineers